The discography of British singer Liam Payne consists of one studio album, two EPs, twelve singles, nine music videos, and a guest appearance. His debut EP, First Time, was released on 24 August 2018 via Capitol Records. His debut single "Strip That Down", which features American rapper Quavo, is his most successful single to date. Released in early 2017, the song charted at number 3 in the United Kingdom, 2 in Australia and Ireland, 4 in New Zealand and Belgium and 10 in the United States. It was certified single platinum in the UK, Germany, New Zealand and Sweden, triple platinum in the United States and quadruple in Australia, alongside a gold certification in France. His second single, a collaboration with German DJ Zedd, was certified silver in the UK. It charted in the top 50 of countries including the UK, Australia, Ireland and Sweden. His third single, "Bedroom Floor", reached number 21 in the UK and was certified silver there and gold in Australia. "For You", Payne's fourth single which features vocalist Rita Ora, was certified gold in five countries and platinum in Australia. It was included on the Fifty Shades Freed album soundtrack for the film of the same name. The song became his first number-one single after it topped the German chart, placed at number 2 in France and number 3 in Switzerland. His subsequent singles in 2018, "Familiar", "First Time" and "Polaroid", featured collaborators such as J Balvin, French Montana, and Jonas Blue, respectively. As of 2021, Payne has sold more than 23 million singles and over three million albums.

Albums

Extended plays

Singles

As lead artist

As featured artist

Promotional singles

Guest appearances

Remixes

Songwriting credits

Music videos

Notes

References

Discographies of British artists